The Pagtibayin at Palaguin ang Pangkabuhayang Pilipino, also known as the 4Ps Party-list, is a political organization seeking party-list representation in the House of Representatives of the Philippines.

Background
4Ps Party-list took part in the 2022 Philippine elections where it is presumed they have already secured at least a seat.

The Partylist Watch and the Department of Social Welfare and Development (DSWD) has sought to nullify the 4Ps Party-list's Securities and Exchange Commission (SEC) for allegedly naming itself after the DSWD's Pantawid Pamilyang Pilipino Program (4Ps) conditional cash transfer program. The 4Ps Party-list has denied doing so pointing out that has consistently said that it does not claim, and will never claim to be associated with the DSWD's 4Ps program and stated that no entity has exclusive legal right to use the 4Ps acronym. However the organization's key platform include the amendment of the 4Ps Law (Republic Act No. 11310) to enhance the program for beneficiaries.

Electoral performance

References

External links
 

Party-lists represented in the House of Representatives of the Philippines